Roberto Fabelo (born 1951 Camagüey, Cuba) is a contemporary Cuban painter, sculptor, and illustrator.

Biography 
Born in Guáimaro, Camagüey, Fabelo studied at The National Art School and at the Instituto Superior de Arte of Havana.  

He was a professor and a jury member for very important national and international visual arts contests. The Cuban state awarded him a medal for National Culture and the Alejo Carpentier medal for his outstanding artistic career. Fabelo's art consists of nude women, who often appear with bird-like features, including a beak and wings. He drew in textbooks, and created figures out of the pictures already in the textbook. Another example of his art was water colored markers used to draw on silk embroidered fabric. 

His work is exhibited at the Museo Nacional de Bellas Artes in Havana, and in the Cuban embassy in Mexico. His 2009 sculpture of a group of human-headed cockroaches can be found climbing one of the walls of the Havana Fine Arts Museum, entitled Survival. He also illustrated a 2007 edition of Gabriel García Márquez's novel Cien años de soledad. He was described by the Dallas Morning News in 2002 as "one of Cuba's premier artists", with high demand for his paintings in the United States and elsewhere.

References

1951 births
Cuban artists
Living people
National Art Schools (Cuba) alumni

Instituto Superior de Arte alumni